Pharga pallens is a species of moth in the family Erebidae. It was first described by William Barnes and James Halliday McDunnough in 1911 and it is found in North America.

The MONA or Hodges number for Pharga pallens is 8516.

References

Further reading

 
 
 

Scolecocampinae
Articles created by Qbugbot
Moths described in 1911